Our Girl is a British television military drama series, written and created by Tony Grounds, first broadcast on BBC One on 24 March 2013. The series initially starred Lacey Turner as Molly Dawes, a young working-class woman, who joins the British Army after deciding her life is going down the drain. Following the feature-length pilot episode, a full series of five episodes was commissioned, commencing broadcast on 21 September 2014.

Turner left her role after the first series, and was replaced by Michelle Keegan as the lead character, Lance Corporal Georgie Lane. The second five-episode series began airing on 7 September 2016. An extended third series, comprising 12 episodes, was commissioned in 2017. The first four episodes, known as the Nepal Tour, began broadcasting on 10 October 2017. The remaining eight episodes aired consecutively from 5 June 2018, with Olly Rix joining the cast as new special forces Captain "Bones" McClyde. In January 2019, it was confirmed by the BBC that Keegan would return for a fourth series of six parts; she also announced that this would be her last series. It began broadcasting on 24 March 2020. Following Keegan's departure, it was announced in August 2020 that the fourth series of Our Girl was the final series.

Plot

Pilot (2013)
18-year-old Molly Dawes (Lacey Turner), who lives in the East End of London, discovers that her boyfriend has been cheating. She feels that her life has no purpose and decides to join the army. Encouraged only by the manager of the recruitment office, Sergeant Lamont (Paul Fox), she initially keeps her decision a secret from her family, which consists of her controlling father Dave (Sean Gallagher) and doting mother Belinda (Kerry Godliman). When the truth is exposed, Dave demands she changes her mind, threatening to disown her if she does not; leaving her to make the heartbreaking decision to step away as she heads off to training camp. Here, Corporal Geddings (Matthew McNulty) initially doubts Molly's merits as a potential soldier, but she strives to prove herself and eventually earns the respect of her peers, even reuniting with her mother Belinda when she visits her to apologise for Dave's actions.

Series 1 (2014)
Molly has completed training as a Combat Medical Technician. She is deployed to Afghanistan attached to a British Army infantry section based from a small UK/ANA shared FOB somewhere in Helmand. She arrives at Camp Bastion in Afghanistan alongside her new team, 2 Section, who are all men. She is disconcerted when she discovers that an ex-flame, Dylan "Smurf" Smith (Iwan Rheon), belongs to her new section, and gets off on the wrong foot with haughty team leader Captain Charles James (Ben Aldridge), a hailed war hero. On arrival in Afghanistan, Molly fights to prove herself to the men around her while also offering compassion to the locals, including 11-year-old Afghan girl Bashira (Becky Eggersglusz), giving herself an understanding of what it is like to be a civilian caught up in the Taliban's war.

Series 2 (2016)
Lance Corporal Georgie Lane (Michelle Keegan) is dispatched on a humanitarian tour to Kenya with 2 Section, and she quickly becomes involved in the activities  of a terrorist group. Georgie's ex-fiancé, Elvis (Luke Pasqualino), a special forces officer in the Special Air Service, frequently attempts to regain her trust after jilting her at the altar on their wedding day several years previously. However, Georgie now has a new boyfriend, Dr. Jamie Cole (Royce Pierreson). Molly has been written out of the story, having returned to Afghanistan for a short tour off-screen. It is briefly mentioned by Captain James that he and Molly are now married.

Series 3: Part 1 (2017)
Georgie, now a corporal, is dispatched alongside 2 Section on a humanitarian mission to Nepal following an earthquake. 2 Section discover a group responsible for trafficking children, connected to the Taliban, which sends them on a covert mission in the heart of Afghanistan supporting special forces. Captain James struggles with the point of British involvement in Afghanistan, and Elvis is desperate to get Georgie back. However, she is uninterested and meets a Nepalese engineer, Milan (Rudi Dharmalingam), whom she takes a shine to. Meanwhile, romance between the two new privates of 2 Section, Maisie (Shalom Brune-Franklin) and Rab (Harki Bhambra), blossoms.

Series 3: Part 2 (2018)
Following Elvis's death, Georgie returns to duty as 2 Section are deployed to Nigeria to help the Nigerian Army in the fight against Boko Haram. But when she goes in search of a group of missing children, who are suspected of having been trafficked out of the country, she is kidnapped and held hostage by a group of Boko Haram rebels. Undercover Special Forces Captain "Bones" McClyde (Olly Rix), who has spent the last six months infiltrating Boko Haram, is forced to break cover in order to save Georgie. Later, 2 Section find themselves in Belize for a jungle training exercise. But when Captain James is severely injured by a bandit trap, Georgie is forced to put all her skills into action in a desperate attempt to save him. In Bangladesh, 2 Section are called to assist local police inspector Chowdrey (Navin Chowdhry) and his wife Barsha (Farzana Dua Elahe) who are running a refugee camp for thousands forced to flee from their war-torn villages, but Georgie soon begins to suspect the inspector of being involved in the trafficking of prostitutes and drug smuggling.

Series 4 (2020)
On 22 January 2019 it was confirmed by the BBC press office that Michelle Keegan would return for a six-part fourth series shooting in April, airing sometime in 2020. On 13 January 2020, Keegan announced that she had quit the role of Georgie and that this would be her final series. The BBC later confirmed that the show would not continue for a fifth series. in Early March it was announced the fourth series would start airing on 24 March 2020. This season Georgie returns as a sergeant. As 2 Section prepares to return to Afghanistan, Georgie is happy to focus on her training role in the UK and send trainee medic Mimi in her place – especially as she is privately haunted by thoughts of Elvis's death. But with Mimi's confidence dipping after some complex training exercises, Georgie is compelled to return to Afghanistan to support the new recruits.
In Kabul, she is pleasantly surprised at how Afghanistan has changed. But on the way to a local hospital in Kabul, she and some of the section are caught up in a suicide attack targeted at Dr Bahil, the hospital administrator and a candidate in upcoming local elections. Georgie learns that the attack was orchestrated by Aatan Omar - Elvis's killer - who is still at large. 
Meanwhile, the newest members of 2 Section bed in: Prof, an ex-teacher with a painful past; Throbber, the section's clown, who has some growing up to do; and Sandy, their new commanding officer, who is determined to show them who's in charge. Mimi, meanwhile, harbours a secret about her home life.

Reception
The feature-length pilot episode first broadcast on BBC One on 24 March 2013 at 9:00pm. Based on official overnight figures, it gained an audience of 5.34 million viewers. Consolidated viewing increased this figure to 6.31 million. The pilot received mixed to positive reviews, with Dan Owen of MSN praising Turner's acting and the moving storyline, while criticising some of the characterisation and "weird shortcuts in the storyline". Sarah Crompton of The Telegraph found the pilot "compelling" but argued that "the depiction of the army – which became too obviously her surrogate family – would be better suited to a glossy advertising campaign than a television drama, glamorising both its methods and its personnel". Audience reaction on social media website Twitter was overall positive.

Broadcast
The series premiered in Australia on ABC on 16 April 2015. In New Zealand, the series premiered on TVNZ on 3 May 2015. In Sweden, the series premiered on SVT on 15 June 2015. In Finland, the series premiered on Yle on 20 March 2017. On 7 April 2016 the series premiered in Germany under the title Eine Frau an der Front (A Woman on the Frontline) and in France and Belgium under the title Molly, une femme au combat (Molly: A Woman In Battle).

Cast

2 Section
 Lacey Turner as Private Molly Dawes, MC (pilot–series 1)
 Michelle Keegan as Lance Corporal/Corporal/Sergeant Georgie Lane (series 2–4)
 Will Attenborough as Second Lieutenant Oliver 'Sandy' Hurst (series 4)
 Ben Aldridge as Captain Charles James (series 1–3)
 Danny Hatchard as Private Rhett ‘Cheese’ Charlton (series 4)
 Amy-Leigh Hickman as Mimi Saunders (series 4)
 Nico Mirallegro as Private "Prof" Grant (series 4)
 Kaine Zajaz as Private Kane "Throbber" Wolfe (series 4)
 Simon Lennon as Private Harry "Brains" Wiggerty (series 1–3)
Sean Ward as Private Frankie "Fingers" Stille (series 1–4)
 Sean Sagar as Private Jaiden "Monk" Montgomery (series 2–4)
 Rolan Bell as Colour Sergeant "Kingy" King (series 2–4)
 Harki Bhambra as Private Rab Kalil (series 3)
 Shalom Brune-Franklin as Private Maisie Richards (series 3)
 Patrick McNamee as Private Jason "Ruby" Curry (series 3)
 John Michie as Brigadier (series 3)
 Dominic Jephcott as Brigadier (series 4)
 Adam Astill as Major Beck (series 1)
 Iwan Rheon as Private Dylan "Smurf" Smith (series 1)
 Lawrence Walker as Private "Dangleberries" (series 1–2)
 Nick Preston as Private Mike "Mansfield Mike" Cheam (series 1–2)
 Arinze Kene as Corporal "Eggy" Kinders (series 1)
 Charley Palmer Rothwell as Private "Baz Vegas" (series 1)
 Ade Oyefeso as Private "Nude-Nut" (series 1)

Special Forces
 Luke Pasqualino as Captain Elvis Harte (series 2–3)
 Olly Rix as Captain "Bones" McClyde (series 3)
 Mark Armstrong as SFS "Spanner" (series 2–4)
 Dwane Walcott as SFS "Peanut" (series 3)
 Ashley Houston as SFS "Dyno" (series 3)
 Jed O'Hagan as SFS "Spunky" (series 2)
 Jack Parry Jones as SFS "Jackson" (series 2–4)
 Ben Batt as SFS "Blue" (series 3–4)

Families
 Kerry Godliman as Belinda Dawes (pilot–series 1)
 Sean Gallagher as Dave Dawes (pilot–series 1)
 Mimi Keene as Jade Dawes (pilot)
 Sean Gilder as Max Lane (series 2–4)
 Angela Lonsdale as Grace Lane (series 2–4)
 Linzey Cocker as Marie Lane (series 2–4)
 Molly Wright as Lulu Lane (series 2)
 Royce Pierreson as Dr. Jamie Cole (series 2)

Army
 Matthew McNulty as Corporal Geddings; British Army (pilot)
 Fiona Skinner as Corporal Richards; British Army (pilot)
 Kirsty Averton as Private Jackie Aston; British Army (series 1)

Alliances (Army)
 Jonas Khan as Captain Azizi; Afghan National Army (series 1, 3)
 Tamer Burjaq as Sohail; Afghan National Army (series 1)
 Zubin Varla as Qaseem; British Army, Teacher (series 1)
 Anthony Oseyemi as Captain Osman; Kenya Army (series 2)
 Pranesh Maharaj as Major Thapa; Nepalese Army (series 3)
 Steve Toussaint as Captain Roger Mendez; Belize Armed Forces (series 3)
 Patrick Sithole as Adewole; Nigerian Army (series 3)
 Hamza Jeetooa as Captain Das; Bangladesh Army (series 3)
 Josh Bowman as (Dr.) Captain Antonio; United States Army (series 4)
 Nebras Jamali as Cadet Poya Afghan National Army (series 4)
 Nabil Elouahabi as Rabee Afghan National Army (series 4)

Alliances
 Yusra Warsama as Nafula - NGO (series 2)
 Anna Tena as Kicki - NGO (series 2)
 Rudi Dharmaling as Milan - NGO (series 3)
 Farzana Dua Elahe as Barsha Chowdhrey - NGO (series 3)
 Badria Timimi as Dr Bahil (series 4)

Main Enemies
 Aubrey Shelton as Badrai (series 1)
 Michael James as Jason Raynott (series 2)
 Sabin Basnet as Da Chand (series 3)
 Nebras Jamali as Poya (series 4)
 Nabil Elouahabi as Aatan/ Aaban Omar (Rabee) (series 4)
 Kiroshan Naidoo as Zarek (series 4)

Others
 Becky Eggersglusz as Bashira (series 1)
 Salina Shrestha as Tara (series 3)
 Navin Chowdhry as Inspector Chowdhrey (series 3)

Episodes

References

External links
 
 
 
 

2013 British television series debuts
2020 British television series endings
2010s British drama television series
2020s British drama television series
BBC high definition shows
BBC television dramas
British military television series
English-language television shows
Media and communications in the London Borough of Newham
Television shows set in Afghanistan
Television shows set in Kenya
Television shows set in London
Television shows set in Manchester
Television shows set in Nepal
Television series by BBC Studios
Television shows filmed in Nepal